Ye Yonglie (30 August 1940 – 15 May 2020) was a Chinese writer of science fiction and biographies. A few of his stories have been translated into English in The Road to Science Fiction series and elsewhere. During the "Anti-Spiritual Pollution Campaign" his works were attacked and a story he wrote in 1985 was suppressed for suggesting AIDS had entered the country. As a biographer he wrote on early figures in the People's Republic of China. He also visited North Korea, and wrote a book The Real DPRK (真实的朝鲜) which was banned in that country and China.

References

External links

Ye Yonglie entry in the Encyclopedia of Science Fiction

Chinese science fiction writers
1940 births
2020 deaths
Writers from Wenzhou
Chinese biographers
Male biographers
20th-century Chinese male writers